Dafydd ap Gruffydd (c. 1600) was a Welsh poet from the Caer Drewyn area. He is known to have composed didactic verses, such as '', but little is known about him generally.

References 

Welsh male poets